Rossa is a surname. Notable people with the surname include:

 Boryana Rossa (b. 1972), Bulgarian artist
 Guido Rossa, (1934 – 1979), Italian worker and syndicalist 
 Jeremiah O'Donovan Rossa (1831-1915), Irish-American Fenian leader
 Maria Rita Rossa, Italian politician

See also
Rossa (disambiguation)
Rosso (surname)

References

surnames